Evorinea is a genus of beetles in the family Dermestidae, containing the following species:

 Evorinea bicolorata Pic, 1939
 Evorinea curta Pic, 1894
 Evorinea flava Motschulsky, 1863
 Evorinea hirtella Walker, 1858
 Evorinea indica Arrow, 1915
 Evorinea iota Arrow, 1915
 Evorinea madagascarica Háva, 2002
 Evorinea marie Háva, 2005
 Evorinea rufotestacea Pic, 1952
 Evorinea villosa Boheman, 1851

References

Dermestidae